Damyan Georgiev (Bulgarian: Дамян Георгиев), (born 18 January 1950) is a former Bulgarian football (soccer) player. Georgiev was a striker for Cherno More Varna from 1969 to 1978. He played 213 matches and scored 56 goals in the top Bulgarian division. For Bulgaria U19, Georgiev was capped 11 times. He represented Bulgaria U19 at the 1969 European Under-19 Football Championship in Germany. Georgiev was capped 16 times and for Bulgaria U21.

Coaching career
Throughout his career Damyan Georgiev has been the manager of the following football teams : Cherno More Varna and amateurs Ovech Provadia, Botev Novi Pazar and Lokomotiv Kaspichan.

References

1950 births
Bulgarian footballers
Bulgarian football managers
PFC Cherno More Varna players
First Professional Football League (Bulgaria) players
PFC Cherno More Varna managers
Living people

Association football forwards
Sportspeople from Varna, Bulgaria